Characters from the Days Later series (the films 28 Days Later and 28 Weeks Later and from the graphic novel 28 Days Later: The Aftermath) are listed below.

28 Days Later characters

Civilians
Jim (played by Cillian Murphy) is a bicycle courier who lived in Deptford, London with his parents. He wakes up in hospital to find the streets empty, as the virus has already spread.

Selena (played by Naomie Harris) is a young woman who lived in London. During the outbreak of the Rage Virus, Selena's family was killed and she hid in a barricaded shop in the London Underground with another survivor named Mark. She survives the outbreak of Infection in District One and flies to New York with Clint Harris. She finds Jim and they join forces to survive. Selena is often shown as very tough, having no qualms about killing the infected, but is also very caring.

Hannah (played by Megan Burns) is the daughter of Frank, a cab driver. When the virus broke out, she and her father barricaded themselves into their apartment. She is a very skilled driver, and has a good relationship with her father.

Frank (played by Brendan Gleeson) was a cheerful cab driver in London and lived with his wife and daughter Hannah in an apartment block near the center of the city. His cab becomes the getaway vehicle for a band of survivors. When they reach Manchester, he becomes infected when blood from an infected crow drops into his eye; he is then shot by the soldiers.

Mark (played by Noah Huntley) was a young man who lived in London with his parents and sister. During the outbreak of the Rage Virus, his family was killed by a surging crowd. Mark survived and hid in a barricaded shop in the London Underground with Selena. Eventually, Jim joins their group. Mark is wounded in the arm during an attack by Jim's infected neighbours, and is then hacked to death by Selena with her machete.

Military 
Major Henry West (played by Christopher Eccleston) is a veteran in the British Army. West is killed by Private Mailer, an infected soldier who had been kept in chains for observation and is later used as the weapon that kills West's men. Hannah reverses her father's taxi into the mansion, allowing Mailer to attack and claw West to death.

Sergeant Farrell (played by Stuart McQuarrie) is a veteran soldier of the British Army and serves as Major Henry West's second-in-command. Farrell is executed by Mitchell and Jones for defending Jim, Selena, and Hannah from the other soldiers.  

Corporal Mitchell (played by Ricci Harnett) is a vulgar, cocky, and insensitive soldier under Major Henry West's command. Mitchell's eyes are gouged out by Jim.  

Private Bedford (played by Ray Panthaki) is a soldier killed by the infected Mailer and Clifton. 

Private Bell (played by Junior Laniyan) is a soldier killed by the infected Mailer and Clifton.

Private Clifton (played by Luke Mably) is a soldier infected by Mailer. Dies when the infected Mailer crashes through a window and spits in his mouth. 

Private Davis (played by Sanjay Rambaruth) is a soldier killed by Jim when he & West hunted down the escaped Jim. 

Private Jones (played by Leo Bill) is a young, inexperienced soldier. He serves as the cook for the group. He is stabbed by Jim when he returns to the mansion, and bleeds out in Major West's arms.

Private Mailer (played by Marvin Campbell) is a soldier who is infected two days before Jim arrives. He is chained up to see how long it would take for an Infected to starve to death.

Main Host

Rage Chimps (played by trained animals) are chimpanzees that are test subjects at a primate research center in Cambridge, that were the first beings to be infected with the man-made virus Rage, eventually they become enact a deadly aggressiveness towards others.

28 Weeks Later characters

Civilians

Donald "Don" Harris (played by Robert Carlyle) is the husband of Alice and father of Tammy and Andy. He becomes infected when he kisses his wife who he thought had been killed during the original outbreak, though she was a carrier of the virus. He causes the second outbreak and is later killed by his daughter, Tammy.

Tammy Harris (played by Imogen Poots) is the daughter of Don and Alice and older sister to Andy. Unlike her mother and brother, she has no heterochromial eye colours, presumably taking more characteristics from her father.

Andy Harris (played by Mackintosh Muggleton) is the son of Don and Alice and younger brother to Tammy.

Alice Harris (played by Catherine McCormack) is the wife of Don and mother of Tammy and Andy. One of her most distinguished features was that she has heterochromatic eye color, which she passes onto Andy. She becomes a carrier of the Rage virus, and ends up inadvertently infecting her husband Don, who brutally kills her once he is infected. 

Geoff (played by Garfield Morgan) is an old farmer who lives with his wife Sally on a farm in the country a few miles from Sandford. He is later infected.

Sally (played by Amanda Walker) is an old woman who lives with her husband Geoff on a farm in the country. Her fate is unknown, although it is likely she is either killed or infected.

Sam (played by Raymond Waring) is Karen's boyfriend. He joins the group of survivors during the second Rage Virus outbreak, and tries to climb on Flynn's helicopter to escape infected, only to fall, either dying or becoming infected.

Karen (played by Emily Beecham) is Sam's girlfriend and lives in the country with him. She becomes infected during an attack at a farm house she and a few other survivors hide at.

Jacob is a young fisherman who lives in the country. He hides out in the farmhouse with Don, Alice and a few others, when he tries to escape with Don, he becomes infected and then killed when Don uses the boat's engine to chop him to pieces.

Refugee Boy lives in Sandford, several miles upriver from Geoff and Sally's farm, with his mother and father. He is presumably killed when the infected break into the house.

Military

Major Scarlet Levy (played by Rose Byrne) is chief medical officer of District 1. She is killed by an infected Don Harris, who ambushes her in the London Underground and beats her to death.

Sergeant Doyle (played by Jeremy Renner) is a Delta marksman with the rooftop observation unit of District 1. He sacrifices himself to get Levy and the Harris children to safety by push-starting the escape car, and is burned on sight with a flamethrower.

Brigadier General Stone (played by Idris Elba) is the ranking officer on-site for the United States Army's 82nd Airborne Division. He eventually initiates Code Red, a procedure for total extermination of the London populace, with no time available to tell infected from uninfected. 

Flynn (played by Harold Perrineau) is a helicopter pilot in 160th SOAR and a family man. He takes the Harris children to France after they facilitate the second outbreak of the Rage virus, his status is unknown as the last image of his helicopter shows that he has abandoned it.

28 Days Later: The Aftermath characters

Military
Army Doctor Westchester was an Army Doctor in the U.S. Military.

Civilians
Allie and her brother Callum were apparently wealthy individuals who lived in London with their father and were good friends with Sophie and her family.

Barbara was the wife of Roger and mother of Sid, Sophie and Liam. 

Bradley lived in Cambridge with Clive's Ex-Wife, now his own, and treated her with the respect and courtesy Clive lacked.

Doctor Clive was a scientist at Cambridge University and Warren's lab partner.

Doctor Warren was the head scientist at Cambridge University and Clive's lab partner. 

Hugh Baker was a popular newsagent in London.

Liam was the youngest son of Roger and Barbara and younger brother to Sid and Sophie. 

Lieb was a member of "The Financiers", a secret group of industrialists and businessmen who sought to make money by selling radical new products to the world.  

Mrs Baker is the wife of Hugh Baker, the London newsagent.

Roger was the husband of Barbara and father of Sid, Sophie and Liam. 

Sid was the oldest child of Roger and Barbara and older brother to Sophie and Liam, and was an aspiring musician and adopted the punk-look when he became a young man. 

Sophie is the middle child of Roger and Barbara, older sister to Liam, and younger sister to Sid.

External links 

28 Days Later at Metacritic

28 Days Later
28 Days